Talanga tolumnialis, the figleaf moth, is a moth in the family Crambidae. It was described by Francis Walker in 1859. It is found in Papua New Guinea and Australia, where it has been recorded from the Northern Territory, Queensland and New South Wales.

Subspecies
Talanga tolumnialis tolumnialis
Talanga tolumnialis major Rothschild, 1915 (Papua New Guinea)

References

Moths described in 1859
Spilomelinae